N. Rajam (born 1938) is an Indian violinist who performs Hindustani classical music. She remained professor of music at Banaras Hindu University, eventually became head of the department and the dean of the Faculty of Performing Arts of the university.

She was awarded the 2012 Sangeet Natak Akademi Fellowship, the highest honour in the performing arts conferred by the Sangeet Natak Akademi, India's National Academy for Music, Dance and Drama.

Early life and training
N. Rajam was born in Chennai in 1938 in a musical family. Her father, Vidwan A. Narayana Iyer was a well-known exponent of Carnatic music. Her brother, T. N. Krishnan, was a prominent violinist of the Carnatic style. Rajam started her initial training in Carnatic music under her father. She also trained under Musiri Subramania Iyer, and learned raga development from vocalist Omkarnath Thakur.

Rajam received the prestigious titles of Padma Shri and Padma Bhushan from the Government of India.

Personal life

N.Rajam is married to T.S.Subramanian, a chartered accountant and a former executive of Life Insurance Corporation of India. Her mother in law Mrs. Padma Swaminathan,social activist and Carnatic music singer, was the last surviving daughter of F. G. Natesa Iyer Mrs. Vani Jairam,playback singer in South Indian cinema,  is her sister in law.

Performing career
Under the guidance of her father, A. Narayana Iyer, Rajam developed the Gayaki Ang (vocal style). Rajam has performed across the globe and in numerous places throughout India.

Rajam was a professor of music at Banaras Hindu University (BHU) in the Faculty of Performing Arts for nearly 40 years. She has been the chair of the department and the dean of the college at BHU.

Students
She trained her daughter Sangeeta Shankar, her granddaughters Ragini Shankar and Nandini Shankar, her niece Kala Ramnath, Pranav Kumar, Prof. V. Balaji (B.H.U.) and Dr. Satya Prakash Mohanty

Awards
Sangeet Natak Akademi Award, 1990
Padma Shri, 1984
Padma Bhushan, 2004
Puttaraja Sanmaana, 2004
 Pune Pandit Award, 2010, by The Art & Music Foundation, Pune, India
 2012: Sangeet Natak Akademi Fellowship (Akademi Ratna)
2018: Tana Riri award

Discography
 Violin Dynasty (Raga Bageshri)
 Dr. (Mrs.) N. Rajam (violin recital)
 A Duet On Strings

References

External links

1938 births
Hindustani instrumentalists
Indian violinists
Hindustani violinists
Living people
Recipients of the Padma Bhushan in arts
Recipients of the Padma Shri in arts
Musicians from Chennai
Recipients of the Sangeet Natak Akademi Award
Tamil musicians
Academic staff of Banaras Hindu University
Recipients of the Sangeet Natak Akademi Fellowship
Indian music educators
21st-century violinists